Anshu Ambani is a fashion designer and former Indian actress who was primarily active in the Telugu and Tamil films from 2002 to 2004.

Early and personal life
Anshu is from London, United Kingdom.

Ambani married a man named Sachin, also from London, soon after Raghavendra. They have a daughter. She is currently busy with her clothing labels 'Inspiration Couture'.

Career
Ambani was first recognized by cameraman Kabir Lal, who introduced her to director K. Vijaya Bhaskar, who later cast her in Manmadhudu alongside Nagarjuna. The actress also appeared in a Tamil film called Jai starring Prashanth in the lead role. After her wedding, she quit the film industry.

Filmography

References

External links
 

British female models
21st-century British actresses
Living people
Indian film actresses
British Hindus
Actresses in Telugu cinema
Actresses in Tamil cinema
Actresses from London
1986 births
21st-century English women
21st-century English people